The FMW Women's Championship (or the FMW Independent Women's & WWA Women's Championship) was two Japanese women's professional wrestling championships (WWA World Women's Championship and FMW Independent World Women's Championship) contested in the promotion Frontier Martial-Arts Wrestling (FMW). During the heyday of FMW, the female wrestlers wrestled in the same types of bloody death matches as the FMW men, and were feared by other Japanese female wrestlers for their toughness and intensity.

Title history

Names

Reigns

Combined reigns

See also
IWGP Women's Championship, a women's championship in a male-majority promotion (New Japan Pro Wrestling)

References

Frontier Martial-Arts Wrestling championships
Women's professional wrestling championships